Ahad Javansalehi (born 16 September 1965 in Ardabil) is an Iranian wrestler. He competed at the 1988 Summer Olympics and the 1992 Summer Olympics.

References

External links
 

1965 births
Living people
Iranian male sport wrestlers
Olympic wrestlers of Iran
Wrestlers at the 1988 Summer Olympics
Wrestlers at the 1992 Summer Olympics
People from Ardabil
Asian Games medalists in wrestling
Wrestlers at the 1986 Asian Games
Wrestlers at the 1994 Asian Games
Medalists at the 1986 Asian Games
Asian Games bronze medalists for Iran
Asian Wrestling Championships medalists
20th-century Iranian people
21st-century Iranian people